Gena Branscombe (4 November 1881 – 26 July 1977) was a Canadian pianist, composer, music educator and choir conductor who lived and worked in the United States.

Early life and education
Gena Branscombe was born 4 November 1881 in Picton, Ontario.  Her musical talent was apparent at an early age.  She studied piano and harmony with local teachers.  In addition, she had an easy ability improvising and sight reading.  Gena entered high school at age eleven and graduated by age fourteen.  With her musical talent and drive to succeed, the decision was made to send her to college for a music degree.

With her mother as moral support for one year, Branscombe moved to Chicago in 1896 where she was accepted at the Chicago Musical College.  Chicago became her home for the next eleven years as she became financially self-sufficient through her accompanying, teaching private piano lessons and having her songs published.  In 1900 and 1901, she won gold medals in composition from the college. After graduation, she joined the faculty of the Chicago Musical College.

Of great influence to her life and compositional style were three teachers.  Swiss born pianists, composer and conductor Rudolph Ganz was Branscombe's piano teacher.  Private composition lessons were taken with Felix Borowski.  No doubt his deep appreciation of the rich, lush and complex harmonies of the German Romantic era greatly influenced Branscombe's compositions.  Her harmonies are intricate, rooted in the understanding of how dissonance and resolution affect word painting in her songs and instrumental works.  Under the guidance of German born Alexander von Fielitz, Branscombe studied song writing.  Her understanding of setting text to music may have come from him.

Career
Resigning her position at the Chicago Musical College in 1907, Branscombe became head of the piano department at Whitman College, Walla Walla, Washington .  This move was prompted by a desire to advance her professional career, challenge her musical growth and earn better wages.  There she met her future husband, John Ferguson Tenney.  Upon the completion of two years of teaching at Whitman in 1909, she left the United States for one year of intensive piano and composition lessons in Berlin.  She received an honorary Master of Arts degree from Whitman College in 1932.

Her piano teacher in Berlin was again Rudolf Ganz.  The renowned composer and teacher, Engelbert Humperdinck was her composition teaching during her year in Berlin.  During her life, Branscombe spoke infrequently of her lessons with the master teacher.  Before leaving Berlin to return home, Branscombe was the "guest of honor" at a "garden evening" given at the Humperdinck home in the early summer. She was one of only three or four women guests. Fifteen male students attended the event, at which an early quintet of Humperdinck's was performed and a Schumann quartet was played. Humperdinck and Branscombe's fellow students urged her to perform, but she declined. This party in her honor does indicate the esteem in which she must have been held.

During her year in Berlin, Branscombe and her fellow student, Belle Forbes, performed at a private dinner party given for president and Mrs. Theodore Roosevelt.  She was featured in a Musical America magazine article, entitled "Women Composers of America".  In addition, her works were included on a Women's Philharmonic Society of New York concert of American women composers which also included works by Mrs. H.H.A. Beach and Mary Turner Salter.

Upon returning home in the summer of 1910, Branscombe began preparations for her marriage to John Ferguson Tenney on 5 October in Picton.  Shortly thereafter, the couple moved to New York City where they resided until their respective deaths.  The couple raised their family of four daughters in the city all the while pursuing their respective careers.

In 1920, Branscombe completed her largest work, the oratorio Pilgrims of Destiny, based on the Mayflower pilgrims' arrival in November 1620.  The National League of American Pen Women awarded this work their national Best Composition award in 1928.  A gala performance took place in Plymouth, Massachusetts as part of National Federation of Music Clubs national convention.  Due to the patriotic subject matter of her oratorio and the many awards presented to her, the Music Department of the Library of Congress in 1960 requested Branscombe's original orchestral score and orchestra parts for Pilgrims of Destiny.

The oratorio was a family effort with Branscombe writing the libretto with the help of her husband, John, who researched the passenger lists of those on board the ships sailing to America. He also served as proof reader.  The couple worked as a team to see Pilgrims of Destiny to its completion and first performance.

Gena Branscombe founded her own women's chorus, the Branscombe Choral (1934-1954), with members from New Jersey, New York City boroughs, and Connecticut.  Membership consisted of women from all walks of life, from professionally trained musicians to amateurs who could not read music.  She held all these forces together as conductor, composer, promoter and fund raiser.  Yearly concerts were given at Town Hall and the Broadway Tabernacle Church.  The Choral performed at the first United Nations, on nationwide radio broadcasts and sang Christmas carols for the commuters at Pennsylvania Station and Grand Central Station.

Prominent opera and concert singers of the era performed her art songs on recital programs across the United States and in Europe. In 1908, Metropolitan Opera soprano Lillian Nordica performed Branscombe's "Hail Bounteous May" during a national recital tour.  Many renowned recitalists of the period including David Bispham, Norman Jolliffe, Gladys Buckhout and George Hamlin performed her songs regularly.  In 1947, internationally acclaimed soprano Mary Bothwell presented a recital at The Hague featuring Branscombe's songs.  Classical trumpeter Edna White, the first person ever to present a solo trumpet recital at Carnegie Hall in New York City, performed Branscombe's "Procession" from her Quebec Suite.

Branscombe participated in several professional organizations outside the musical mainstream. She held national office for the General Federation of Women's Clubs, National League of American Pen Women, National Federation of Music Clubs, Society of American Women Composers and American Society of Composers, Authors and Poets and Altusa International.

Her extended involvement with the General Federation of Women's Clubs established Branscombe as a mentor and conductor.  From 1930 to 1935 she was Chairman of American Music and Folksong Committee and a member of the executive board until 1945.

The Golden Jubilee Convention of the General Federation of Women's Clubs, held in 1941 in Atlantic City, New Jersey, featured a mass chorus of one thousand members from across the United States conducted by Gena Branscombe.  Working over a year in advance, Branscombe created a concert program featuring works by herself, Mabel Daniels, Harriet Ware, Edgar Stillman Kelley, Mozart, Haydn and others. She detailed a list of instructions for the music's preparation and sent these to the conductors of the club choruses nationwide. In Atlantic City, with only one rehearsal of the combined one thousand, the concert was considered a stirring performance, with one thousand women from across the United States raising their voices to American music.

During Gena Branscombe's lifetime, 22 different music companies published 74 of her choral compositions, 150 art songs, 13 piano pieces and 8 instrumental works.  Her publishers included Arthur P.  Schmidt (promoter and publisher of American women composers), Wa Wan Press, Oliver Ditson of Boston, Gustave Schirmer, Summy Birchard, HW Gray, J. Fisher, Hatch Music Company of Philadelphia, Whaley Royce and Company and Boosey-Hawkes.

Personal life

Gena Branscombe was born to parents, Henry William Branscombe, a dentist, optometrist and druggist and her mother, Sara Elizabeth Allison Branscombe, poet and newspaper woman.  She had two older brothers, the first died in infancy and her second brother, Clarence Henry who was ten years older than she.  Her heritage was from the village of Branscombe in Devonshire, England and of Scottish Highlander, Holland and Sweden.

Gena Branscombe married John Ferguson Tenney of Methuen, Massachusetts.  At the time of their meeting in December 1908 in Walla Walla, Washington, John was working as an attorney in Seattle.  By spring 1909, they were engaged with the understanding that Gena would be leaving for one-year study in Berlin.  They married in the Fall 1910 and moved to New York City where both would pursue their careers.

Their daughters were: Gena born in 1911 (d. 2007), Vivian in 1913 (d. 1990), Betty in 1916 (d. 1919) and Beatrice in 1919. Her husband, John, died in 1949. 
Branscombe composed until shortly before her death in New York City on 26 July 1977. After her death, her manuscripts were donated to the Music Division of The New York Public Library for the Performing Arts.

Works
Selected works include:
The Bells of Circumstance, Unfinished opera, 1928
Festival Prelude for orchestra, 1913
Quebec Suite (excerpt from Bells of Circumstance) 1928
Ten (in Prologue) for orchestra
Baladine for chamber orchestra, 1930
Procession for orchestra, 1930.
Elegie for orchestra, 1937
Just in the Hush before the Dawn, 1946
The Morning Wind (Banning) for female voices, orchestra, 1912
The Sun Dial: a Cycle of Love Songs of the Open Road (Banning) for solo voice, piano, 1913
Dear Lad O'Mine (Hale) for female voices, orchestra, 1915
Spirit of Motherhood (Driscoll) for female voices, orchestra, 1923
A Wind from the Sea (Longfellow) for female voices, orchestra, 1924
The Dancer of Fjaard (Branscombe) for soli, female voices, orchestra, 1926
The Phantom Caravan (Banning) for male voices, orchestra, 1925
At the Postern Gate (Banning) for male voices, orchestra, 1918
Pilgrims of Destiny (Branscombe) for soli, SATB, orchestra, 1919

Branscombe wrote professional articles including:
"The sound of trumpets", Showcase, vol 61, no. 3, 1962

References

External links

 
"Gena Branscombe" The Canadian Encyclopedia.
Gena Branscombe scores in the Music Division of The New York Public Library for the Performing Arts.

 Archival papers at the University of Toronto Music Library

1881 births
1977 deaths
20th-century classical composers
Canadian music educators
Piano pedagogues
Canadian classical composers
People from Prince Edward County, Ontario
Whitman College faculty
American music educators
American women music educators
American women classical composers
American classical composers
20th-century Canadian composers
20th-century American women musicians
20th-century American musicians
20th-century American composers
20th-century women composers
American women academics
Canadian women composers